Dehkhoda (also Romanized as Dehkhodā; also known as Khowr Khārān, Khowr Khūrān, Khūr Kharān, and Khvor Kharān) is a village in Salakh Rural District, Shahab District, Qeshm County, Hormozgan Province, Iran. At the 2006 census, its population was 525, in 127 families.

References 

Populated places in Qeshm County